Artigues is the name or part of the name of several communes in France:

 Artigues, Ariège, in the Ariège department
 Artigues, Aude, in the Aude department
 Artigues, Hautes-Pyrénées, in the Hautes-Pyrénées department
 Artigues, Var, in the Var department
 Artigues-près-Bordeaux, in the Gironde department
 Les Artigues-de-Lussac, in the Gironde department

It may also refer to a locality in the metropolitan area of Barcelona:
Artigues, Badalona
The Barcelona Metro station Artigues-Sant Adrià

See also
 Artigue, in the Haute-Garonne department